Mark Sherman may refer to:

 Mark Sherman (collector), American biochemist and string figure enthusiast
 Mark Sherman (musician) (born 1957), jazz vibraphonist, pianist and drummer